Leobardo Alcalá Padilla (born 28 August 1960) is a Mexican politician affiliated with the PRI. He currently serves as Deputy of the LXII Legislature of the Mexican Congress representing Jalisco.

References

1960 births
Living people
Politicians from Jalisco
Institutional Revolutionary Party politicians
21st-century Mexican politicians
University of Guadalajara alumni
Academic staff of the University of Guadalajara
Mexican physicians
Deputies of the LXII Legislature of Mexico
Members of the Chamber of Deputies (Mexico) for Jalisco